2nd Wave is the second studio album by Surface, released in October 1988 on Columbia Records.

A total of five singles were released from the album: "I Missed" completely missed the Billboard Hot 100 while climbing to number 3 on the US R&B charts.  "Closer Than Friends" made the pop charts at number 57, while becoming the first of a quartet of R&B number ones for the group (with "Shower Me with Your Love", "You Are My Everything" and "The First Time" being the other three).

Of all the songs on the album, "Shower Me with Your Love" enjoyed the most success, crossing over and reaching number 5 on the pop charts.

The single "Can We Spend Some Time" reached number 5 on the R&B charts but was not a pop success.  Based on the chart (both pop and R&B) success of the singles, the album peaked at number 56 but was certified platinum (albeit six years later, in 1994).

Reception
AllMusic's Ron Wynn gave the album a rating of four stars (of a possible five).  He called it "a good follow-up for the New Jersey trio", and singled out the songs "Shower Me with Your Love" and "You Are My Everything" as critical picks on the album.

Track listing
"Shower Me with Your Love" (Bernard Jackson) 4:53
"Closer Than Friends" (Jackson, David Townsend) 4:44
"Can We Spend Some Time" (Jackson) 4:30
"You Are My Everything" (Townsend, David Conley, Everett Collins, Derrick Culler) 4:28
"I Missed" (Jackson, Conley, Collins) 4:56
"Black Shades" (Culler, Gene Lennon, Joshua Thompson) 4:57
"Hold On to Love" (Jackson, Townsend, Conley) 4:10
"Where's That Girl" (Jackson, Townsend, Conley) 4:31

Personnel

Surface
 Bernard Jackson – arrangements (1-5, 7, 8), lead vocals, backing vocals (1, 2, 3, 5-8), guitars (3), electric bass (3), rapping (6)
 David Townsend – arrangements (1-5, 7, 8), guitars (1, 3, 4, 5, 7, 8), electric piano (2, 3), synthesizers (2, 7, 8), drum programming (2, 7), backing vocals (4, 6)
 David "Pic" Conley – arrangements (1-5, 7, 8), saxophone (1), synth bass (2, 4, 7, 8), drum programming (2-5, 7, 8), percussion (4), flute (4, 7), backing vocals (4, 6), orchestral hits (5)

Additional Musicians
 Brian Simpson – keyboards (1), synth bass (1), drum programming (1)
 Bobby Wooten – string synthesizer (1), string arrangements (1, 8), conductor (8)
 Vassal Benford – acoustic piano (2, 3), synthesizers (2-5, 7), horns (5), lead guitar (7)
 Everett Collins – synthesizers (4), backing vocals (4), synth bass (5), drum programming (5), drum arrangements (5), percussion (7)
 Joshua Thompson – keyboards (6), guitars (6), synth bass (6), drum programming (6)
 Gene Lennon – computer programming (6), drum programming (6), air filter voice (6)
 "Bassy" Bob Brockmann – cymbals (1)
 Larry Conley – saxophone (6)
 Derrick Culler – arrangements (6), backing vocals (6)
 Len-Thom – arrangements (6)
 Regina Belle – guest vocals (4, 7)
 Kathy "Cat-Nap" Griffin – backing vocals (6)
 Laurie Hawes – backing vocals (6)
 Cheryl Maynard – backing vocals (6)
 Lisa Stevens – backing vocals (6)
 Starleana Young – backing vocals (6)

Strings (Tracks 1 & 8)
 Gene Orloff 
 Julian Barbara
 Alfred Brown
 Arnold Eidus
 Max Ellen
 Harry Lookofsky
 Mark Shuman 
 Marti Sweet
 Fred Zlotkin

Production
 Surface – producers
 John Falzarano – engineer (1)
 David Conley – engineer (2-8)
 Paul Higgins – assistant engineer 
 Joseph Intife – assistant engineer 
 Bob Brockmann – mixing (1, 2, 3, 6, 7)
 Carl Beatty – mixing (4, 5, 8)
 Frank Nogverias – mix assistant 
 Jose Rodriguez – mastering 
 Josephine DiDonato – art direction, design 
 Britain Hill – photography 

Studios
 Overdubbed at House of Music (West Orange, New Jersey).
 Mixed at Marathon Studios (New York City, New York).
 Mastered at Sterling Sound (New York City, New York).

Charts

Weekly charts

Year-end charts

References

1988 albums
Columbia Records albums
Surface (band) albums